Manuel "Manolet" Ledesma Araneta Jr. (8 December 1926 – 4 July 2003) was a Filipino basketball player who competed in the 1948 Summer Olympics. Araneta Jr. was the father of Liza Araneta-Marcos, wife of Philippine president Bongbong Marcos

Araneta Jr. was born on December 8, 1926, in Jaro, Iloilo City, Philippines, but grew up in Bago City , Negros Occidental

References

External links
 

1926 births
2003 deaths
Sportspeople from Iloilo City
Basketball players from Iloilo
De La Salle Green Archers basketball players
FEU Tamaraws basketball players
Olympic basketball players of the Philippines
Basketball players at the 1948 Summer Olympics
Philippines men's national basketball team players
Filipino men's basketball players